Amata polidamon is a moth of the family Erebidae. It was described by Pieter Cramer in 1779. It is found in South Africa.

References

 

Endemic moths of South Africa
polidamon
Moths described in 1779
Moths of Africa